The five-lined snake-eyed skink (Cryptoblepharus quinquetaeniatus) is a species of lizard in the family Scincidae. It is endemic to Anjouan in the Comoro Islands.

References

Cryptoblepharus
Reptiles described in 1874
Taxa named by Albert Günther